
The Henry Hirshfeld House and Cottage are two historic homes in downtown Austin, Texas, United States, originally inhabited by the prominent Hirshfeld family. The cottage, built in 1873, housed Henry and his wife Jennie until the larger house, designed by local architect John Andrewartha, was built in 1885. The homes have been well preserved and today house the Office of Governmental Relations for the Texas A&M University System. The buildings are located at 303 and 305 W. 9th Street. The buildings were added together to the National Register of Historic Places in 1973.

References

External links

Houses in Austin, Texas
Houses on the National Register of Historic Places in Texas
National Register of Historic Places in Austin, Texas
Recorded Texas Historic Landmarks
City of Austin Historic Landmarks